Fantoft Stave Church (Nynorsk: Fantoft stavkyrkje) is a reconstructed stave church in the Fana borough of the city of Bergen, Norway.

History
The church was originally built around the year 1150 at Fortun in Sogn, a village near the inner or eastern end of Sognefjord. In 1879,
the new Fortun Church (Fortun kyrkje) was constructed as a replacement for the medieval stave church. Fantoft Stave Church was threatened with demolition, as were hundreds of other stave churches in Norway. Fantoft Stave Church was bought by consul Fredrik Georg Gade and saved by moving it in pieces to Fana near Bergen in 1883. Outside the church stands a stone cross from Tjora in Sola.

On 6 June 1992, the church was destroyed by arson; the first in a string of church burnings by members of the early Norwegian black metal scene. At first, the fire was thought to have been caused by lightning or an electrical failure. In 1994, Varg Vikernes of the one-man band Burzum was found guilty of burning Old Åsane Church and Storetveit Church in Bergen, the burning of Skjold Church in Vindafjord, and the burning of Holmenkollen Chapel in Oslo. He was also charged with the burning of Fantoft stave church, although the jurors voted not guilty. The judges called this an error but did not overturn the decision. Reconstruction of the church began soon after the fire, taking six years to complete. Since 1997, the church has been surrounded by a security fence.

A photograph of the church's burnt shell appeared on the cover of the 1993 Burzum EP Aske (Norwegian for "ashes").

Gallery

See also
Until the Light Takes Us, documentary film that includes a clip on the arson

References

External links

 Fantoft Stavkirke 

12th-century churches in Norway
Churches completed in 1997
Stave churches in Norway
Churches in Bergen
Churches destroyed by arson
Rebuilt churches
Churches completed in 1150
Buildings and structures in Norway destroyed by arson
Anti-Christian sentiment in Europe